The Tour may refer to:
The Tour de France cycling race
The Tour (album), a 1998 live album by Mary J. Blige
The Olivia Tremor Control/Black Swan Network, an album also known as The Tour EP
The Tour (Kiss and Mötley Crüe), a 2012 concert tour
The Tour (film) (Turneja), a 2008 Bosnian/Serbian film

See also
The Grand Tour, a tour of Europe and the Holy Land conducted by British gentleman in the 18th and 19th century
ABBA: The Tour, third and final concert tour by ABBA
Streisand: The Tour, unofficial name of Barbra Streisand's fall 2006 North American concert tour
Anthems: The Tour, debut headlining concert tour of Kerry Ellis